Teotónio José Pires Dó (born 20 March 1994) is an Angolan basketball player who plays for Petro de Luanda and the Angola national team. 

Dò played college basketball for Arkansas-Fort Smith before starting a professional career in Angola in 2016.

Professional career
Dó started his professional career in his native Angola in 2016 with Benfica do Libolo, with whom he also played in the 2017 FIBA Africa Clubs Champions Cup. In the 2018–19 season, Dó played with ASA. In 2019, he transferred to Primeiro de Agosto.

On 16 September 2022, Dó signed a contract with Petro de Luanda, committing himself until 2024.

National team career
Internationally, Dó respresents the Angola national basketball team. He played with Angola at AfroBasket 2021, where he averaged 2.8 points and 3 rebounds coming off the bench.

References

External links
Teotonio Do at Proballers
Teotonio Do at Afrobasket.com

1994 births
Living people
C.D. Primeiro de Agosto basketball players
Centers (basketball)
Atlético Petróleos de Luanda basketball players
Atlético Sport Aviação basketball players
Angolan men's basketball players